Bhandal Bet  is a village in Kapurthala district of Punjab State, India. The village is administrated by a Sarpanch, who is an elected representative.school bhandal public school
Singer jaimalbhandal

Demography 
According to the report published by Census India in 2011, Bhandal Bet has a total number of 585 houses and population of 2,884 of which include 1,486 males and 1,398 females. Literacy rate of Bhandal Bet is  76.45%, higher than state average of 75.84%.  The population of children under the age of 6 years is 306 which is  10.61% of total population of Bhandal Bet, and child sex ratio is approximately  889, higher than state average of 846.

Population data

Air travel connectivity 
The closest airport to the village is Sri Guru Ram Dass Jee International Airport.

Villages in Kapurthala

External links
  Villages in Kapurthala
 Kapurthala Villages List

References

Villages in Kapurthala district